This is a list of city flags in Slovakia.

Banská Bystrica Region

Bratislava Region

Košice Region

Boroughs

Nitra Region

Prešov Region

Trenčín Region

Trnava Region

Žilina Region

Slovakia